The 1914–15 FA Cup was the 44th season of the world's oldest association football competition, the Football Association Challenge Cup (more usually known as the FA Cup), and the last to be held before the cancellation of all football competitions since due to World War I. Sheffield United won the competition for the third time, beating Chelsea 3–0 in the final at Old Trafford, Manchester.

Matches were scheduled to be played at the stadium of the team named first on the date specified for each round, which was always a Saturday. If scores were level after 90 minutes had been played, a replay would take place at the stadium of the second-named team later the same week. If the replayed match was drawn further replays would be held at neutral venues until a winner was determined. If scores were level after 90 minutes had been played in a replay, a 30-minute period of extra time would be played.

Calendar
The format of the FA Cup for the season had two preliminary rounds, six qualifying rounds, four proper rounds, and the semi finals and final.

First round proper
36 of the 40 clubs from the First and Second divisions joined the 12 clubs who came through the qualifying rounds. Four sides, Lincoln City, Nottingham Forest, Leicester Fosse and Glossop were entered instead at the Sixth Qualifying Round. Of these, only Leicester went out at the qualifying stages, while the other three and nine non-league clubs won through.

Sixteen non-league sides were given byes to the First Round to bring the total number of teams up to 64. These were:

32 matches were scheduled to be played on Saturday, 9 January 1915. Six matches were drawn and went to replays in the following midweek fixture.

Second round proper
The 16 Second Round matches were played on Saturday, 30 January 1915. Three matches were drawn, with the replays taking place in the following weekend fixture. One of these was again drawn, and a second replay was played, again at the following Saturday.

Third round proper
The eight Third Round matches were scheduled for Saturday, 20 February 1915. There were two replays, played the following week, of which one went to a second replay in the following midweek fixture.

Fourth round proper
The four Fourth Round matches were scheduled for Saturday, 6 March 1915. There were two replays, played a week later.

Semi-finals

The semi-final matches were played on Saturday, 27 March 1915. Sheffield United and Chelsea won and went on to meet in the final.

Final

The final took place on 24 April 1915 and was contested by Sheffield United and Chelsea. It was the last FA Cup final to be staged before competitive football was abandoned in Britain because of the First World War. The match was moved from its pre-war location of Crystal Palace in south London to Old Trafford in Manchester to avoid disruption to travel in and around London.

Match details

See also
FA Cup Final Results 1872-

References
General
Official site; fixtures and results service at TheFA.com
1914-15 FA Cup at rsssf.com
1914-15 FA Cup at soccerbase.com

Specific

1914-15
FA
FA